Delta-10-Tetrahydrocannabinol (Delta-10-THC, Δ10-THC, alternatively numbered as Δ2-THC) is a positional isomer of tetrahydrocannabinol, discovered in the 1980s. Two enantiomers have been reported in the literature, with the 9-methyl group in either the (R) or (S) conformation; of these, the (R) enantiomer appears to be the more active isomer as well as the double bond in the 10th position instead of the 9th maintaining about 30 to 40 percent the potency of delta-9-THC. Δ10-THC has rarely been reported as a trace component of natural cannabis, though it is thought to be a degradation product similar to cannabinol rather than being produced by the plant directly. However,  it is found more commonly as an impurity in synthetic delta-8-THC produced from cannabidiol and can also be synthesized directly from delta-9-THC.

See also 
 7,8-Dihydrocannabinol
 9-OH-HHC
 Delta-3-Tetrahydrocannabinol
 Delta-4-Tetrahydrocannabinol
 Delta-7-Tetrahydrocannabinol
 Delta-6-Cannabidiol
 Hexahydrocannabinol
 THC-O-acetate

References 

Benzochromenes
Cannabinoids
Heterocyclic compounds with 3 rings